Johann Elias Ridinger (16 February 1698, Ulm – 10 April 1767, Augsburg) was a German painter, engraver, draughtsman and publisher. He is considered one of the most famous German engravers of animals, particularly horses, hounds and hunting scenes.

He began his training in Ulm with the painter Christoph Resch (1701–16), and later studied under Johann Falch (1687–1727) in Augsburg. He learned the art of engraving from Georg Philipp Rugendas. On the invitation of Wolf, Freiherr von Metternich (1706–31), he spent three years in Regensburg: his coursing and visits to the riding school there proved decisive for his development. His engraved, etched and scratched sheets show the animals in characteristic movements and positions in a landscape environment. The ornamental movements in his works show visibly Rococo stylistic tendencies. He later founded his own art publishing house in Augsburg, where most of his works appeared. In 1759 he became the director of the Augsburg Stadtakademie. His drawings were often executed with precision and taste and hence his work was held in high esteem and was also transferred to decoration, porcelain and ceramics.

See also
 List of German painters

References

External links

 Ridinger Gallery Niemeyer - Publications 
 Sotheby's Catalogue -Old Master & British drawings
  Johann Elias Ridinger in the British Museum Collection Database

1698 births
1767 deaths
18th-century German painters
18th-century German male artists
Animal artists
Draughtsmen
German engravers
German male painters
People from Ulm